Bartolomé Lobo Guerrero (1546 – January 12, 1622) was a Roman Catholic prelate who served as Archbishop of Lima (1607–1622) and the second Archbishop of Santafé en Nueva Granada (1596–1607).

Biography
Bartolomé Lobo Guerrero  was born in Ronda, Spain. On August 12, 1596, Pope Clement VIII, appointed him Archbishop of Archbishop of Santafé en Nueva Granada. On August 24, 1596, he was consecrated bishop by Diego de Romano y Govea, Bishop of Tlaxcala (Puebla de los Angeles). During his time in Mexico, he served as an interrogator for the Mexican Inquisition and participated, along with Alonso de Peralta and Juan de Cervantes, in the torture of Luis de Carvajal and others. On November 19, 1607, Pope Paul V, appointed him the fourth Archbishop of Lima (installed October 4, 1609) where he served until his death on January 12, 1622.

Episcopal succession
While bishop, he was the principal consecrator of:
Pedro Ordóñez y Flórez, Archbishop of Santafé en Nueva Granada; 
Hernando de Arias y Ugarte, Bishop of Quito; 
Pedro de Valencia, Bishop of Santiago de Guatemala; 
Diego Torres Altamirano, Bishop of Cartagena; 
Carlos Marcelo Corni Velazquez, Bishop of Concepción; and 
Fernando de Ocampo, Bishop of Santa Cruz de la Sierra.

References

External links and additional sources
 (for Chronology of Bishops) 
 (for Chronology of Bishops) 
 (for Chronology of Bishops) 
 (for Chronology of Bishops) 

1546 births
1622 deaths
17th-century Roman Catholic bishops in New Granada
17th-century Roman Catholic archbishops in New Spain
17th-century Roman Catholic bishops in Peru
Roman Catholic archbishops of Bogotá
Roman Catholic archbishops of Lima
Bishops appointed by Pope Clement VIII
Bishops appointed by Pope Paul V
University of Salamanca alumni
Spanish Roman Catholic bishops in South America
People from Ronda